Spacer may refer to:

Arts and entertainment
 "Spacer", a song by Sheila and B. Devotion from the 1980 album King of the World
 Spacer (album), 2011 jazz album by Jason Adasiewicz
 Spacers, a fictional sociocultural group in Isaac Asimov's Robot series of novels and short stories

Science and technology

Biology and medicine
 Asthma spacer, medical equipment
 Orthodontic spacer
 Spacer DNA, in genetics
 Spacer in joint replacement

Other uses in science and technology
 Spacer, an element in HTML web design
 Spacers and standoffs, unthreaded pieces of rigid tubing, often used in electronic equipment
 Rebar spacer, in concrete construction

Oil and gas industry

 Spacer, a viscous fluid used to remove drilling fluids ahead of cement slurry. The spacer is made up with specific fluid attributes, such as viscosity and density that are designed to prohibit the interaction between the mud and cement slurry.

Other uses
 Spacer (self-storage), an Australian online market for self storage
 Spacer or flesh tunnel, a type of body piercing

See also
 Space (disambiguation)
 Spacing (disambiguation)
 Placeholder (disambiguation)